Nate Ruess (pronounced  ) is an American singer and songwriter. He is best known as the founder and lead singer of the indie pop band Fun, and of The Format. As of 2015, he also performs as a solo musician.

Early life
Ruess was born the second child of Larry Ruess and Bess Zinger. His uncle, John Ruess, was a performer on Broadway and served as an influence for Ruess's musical ventures.

In 1986, his family moved to a farm in Glendale, Arizona, due to repeated bouts of pneumonia Ruess faced as a child. Ruess's pneumonia and the move are referenced in the lyrics of the song "The Gambler". Ruess remained in Arizona throughout his childhood and attended Deer Valley High School, graduating in 2000. During his time in school, Ruess played in punk bands and upon graduation chose to pursue music professionally. In an interview with American Songwriter Ruess states, "I'm not one to take lessons, so I decided that the only way I was going to learn how to sing, if what they were saying was true, was to go in my car and put on any sort of music from a vocalist that might be really hard to mimic, turn it on as loud as possible and try to hit all those notes". He took a job in a law firm as a way to support himself while he pursued his musical ambitions.

In 2002, at the age of 19, he launched the band the Format with his longtime best friend, Sam Means. The Format was his first musical endeavor to gain widespread attention.

Career

2000–2008: The Format
After forming in 2000, the Format released a five-song EP, titled EP, which generated local interest and led to the band being signed to Elektra Records in 2002. They released their first studio album, Interventions + Lullabies, on October 21, 2003, leading to more local mainstream success. The band's fanbase began to grow, and the Format released their second EP, Snails, with Atlantic Records in April 2005. However, while working on their second album, Dog Problems, they were dropped from Atlantic. They eventually created their own label, The Vanity Label, and released the album on July 10, 2006. On February 4, 2008, Ruess announced through the band's blog that the Format would not be making another album.

2008–2014: fun.

Immediately after the split of the Format, Ruess contacted Jack Antonoff of Steel Train and Andrew Dost, formerly of Anathallo, to form a new band called fun. They released their first demo, "Benson Hedges", through Spins September 20, 2009, article. Four months after releasing their first single, "At Least I'm Not as Sad (As I Used to Be)", through Myspace on April 6, 2009, Fun released their first studio album, entitled Aim and Ignite. The album received generally positive reviews and peaked at 71 on the Billboard 200.

The band's first tour happened in 2008 supporting Jack's Mannequin and gained exposure opening for them as well as Paramore in 2010. On August 4, 2010, Fun announced that they had been signed to the Fueled by Ramen label.

In 2011, in collaboration with the band Panic! at the Disco, the band released the single, "C'mon" with limited vinyl release.

Their second album, Some Nights, was released on February 21, 2012, and featured production by Jeff Bhasker. The album's first single, "We Are Young", which features guest singer Janelle Monáe, was released September 20, 2011. The song was covered on Glee in December 2011, featured in a Chevy Sonic commercial during the Super Bowl in February 2012, and reached number one on the Billboard Hot 100 on March 8, 2012. The album has become a success throughout the world, selling nearly three million copies. The album's title song, "Some Nights", reached number 3 on the Billboard Hot 100 and reached number 1 on the Alternative Songs chart.

On February 10, 2013, Fun won a Grammy for "We Are Young". Upon receiving the Grammy, Ruess commented, "I don't know what I was thinking writing the chorus for this song. If this is in HD, everyone can see our faces, and we are not very young. We've been doing this for 12 years, and I just got to say we could not do this without the help of all the fans that we've had keeping us afloat for the last 12 years." Fun also won the Grammy for Best New Artist.

Alongside Fun, Ruess had been a supporting vocalist for many different songs across genres. In 2012, he was featured on "Only Love" from Anthony Green's second solo album, Beautiful Things, and in 2013 was featured on Pink's album, The Truth About Love, in the song "Just Give Me a Reason". The song began as a simple songwriting session with Pink. She decided the song needed another side to it and subsequently a male part was written. While at first reluctant, with Pink encouraging him, he decided to participate in the duet. The song eventually topped the US Billboard Hot 100, becoming his first number-one single as a solo artist and his second overall. After the success of "Just Give Me a Reason", Ruess was featured on Eminem's eighth studio album The Marshall Mathers LP 2 on the track "Headlights".  Many of Ruess' lyrics were borrowed from a previously unreleased track, "Jumping the Shark", written during the Aim and Ignite sessions.

In 2014, the band released the single "Sight of the Sun" for the HBO series Girls after being approached by show creator Lena Dunham.

On June 18, 2014, Fun debuted a new song on The Tonight Show Starring Jimmy Fallon called "Harsh Lights". It would be the last new Fun song performed before Ruess' pursuing his career as a solo artist, however the band has made it clear that they are on hiatus, not splitting up.

2014–present: Solo projects
On February 5, 2015, Fun posted on their official website their status stating "there was no new Fun album in the works"; instead stating all three members were pursuing their own projects.

In an interview with Rolling Stone, Ruess added, "You get a little selfish about the songs that you write, and it's really hard to do that in a group setting, where there are two other people, and you have to think about everybody else's feelings. I'm writing and singing these songs about myself. When you work with producers versus bandmates, that line becomes a lot less blurry."

In addition to his solo album, Ruess was invited to perform on Brian Wilson's album No Pier Pressure. Wilson, who co-founded the Beach Boys, likened Ruess' voice to his deceased brother and former bandmate Carl Wilson. Ruess then contributed guest vocals to the frequent collaborator Emile Haynie's 2015 release, We Fall. Ruess' then released his first single from his debut album, titled Nothing Without Love, which was sent to the alternative radio on February 23, 2015.

On March 23, 2015, he made the first of multiple appearances, as a guest advisor on the eighth season on The Voice. On April 6, 2015, Ruess announced his debut album would be called Grand Romantic, and it was released on June 16, 2015. On April 27, 2015, Ruess released the opening track from his debut album, titled "AhHa".

In May 2015, he released another song, titled "Great Big Storm", in correlation with the announcement of his solo tour. The song "What The World is Coming To" features guest vocals from American singer-songwriter and musician Beck. It was released as part of the countdown to his new solo album. On May 31, 2015, Ruess made his live debut as a solo artist with his newly formed backup band called the Band Romantic. He performed in Utrecht, Netherlands, at the intimate Tivoli/Vredenburg Cloud Nine location. The set list consisted of the 3 released tracks from "Grand Romantic", several then-unheard tracks from the same album, and songs from Fun such as "Some Nights", "We Are Young", and "Carry On". He also performed "Just Give Me a Reason". On June 1, 2015, Ruess released a new track from his solo album "Grand Romantic", titled "What This World Is Coming To".

On January 1, 2016, Ruess played during the 1st period intermission at the NHL Winter Classic in Foxboro, Massachusetts. On January 12, 2016, he released a music video for his song "Take It Back" starring actor Patrick Fischler and also features a guitar solo from Jeff Tweedy of the band Wilco.

More recently, Ruess has made sporadic appearances in the media and has performed on special occasions. In 2016 he appeared on The Hamilton Mixtape performing the track "My Shot". In 2018, Ruess was credited as a composer and lyricist for Keith Urban on his release Graffiti U. He helped write Urban's track "Way Too Long". Additionally, Ruess has been working as a songwriter and producer. In 2019, he collaborated again with Pink for the track "Walk Me Home", which was released in February for her eighth studio album, called Hurts 2B Human.  In 2020, Ruess had songwriting credits on Halsey's Manic and Kesha's High Road.

On February 3, 2020, Ruess and Sam Means performed a surprise acoustic set together in place of a promised live screening of the Format's 2007 concert film Live at the Mayan Theatre, the first time the duo performed in almost six years.  The band subsequently announced reunion shows in Chicago, Phoenix and New York City. Due to the COVID-19 pandemic, the tour was postponed multiple times before it was ultimately canceled.

Hayley Williams from Paramore believes that Nate secretly used a moniker Benjamin Eli Hanna to co-write the song "Stay the Night".

In November 2021, he appeared on Saturday Night Live as part of musical guest Young Thug's performance of "Love You More."

In 2021, Ruess launched ClayneCast, a podcast about the Lethal Weapon TV series, with his accomplice Drew of the podcast Globe Hell Warning, and his friend, ChapoFYM co-host Tom. It can be found on Spotify, Apple Podcasts as well as Soundcloud. The podcast's second season premiered March 25, 2022.

Personal life
From 2009 to 2013, Ruess dated fashion designer Rachel Antonoff, the sister of Fun guitarist Jack Antonoff. Rachel and Ruess both provided backing vocals for the song "Dakota" from the 2007 album Trampoline by Jack's band Steel Train. Later, Rachel sang on some Fun songs and appeared in the video for "We Are Young". Rachel and Ruess collaborated on The Ally Coalition, an activist project to raise awareness of LGBTQ issues.

Ruess began dating English fashion designer Charlotte Ronson in March 2014. They had their first child, a son, in early 2017. They had their second child, a daughter, in March 2019.

Discography

Solo albums

Singles

As lead artist

As featured artist

Guest appearances

Notes

References

External links
Nate Ruess' Website

Living people
20th-century American singers
21st-century American singers
Alternative rock singers
American indie pop musicians
American indie rock musicians
American male singer-songwriters
American male pop singers
American rock singers
American rock songwriters
American people of German descent
Musicians from Glendale, Arizona
Fun (band) members
Grammy Award winners
Fueled by Ramen artists
People from Manhattan
The Format members
Ronson family
Singer-songwriters from Arizona
Singer-songwriters from New York (state)
Year of birth missing (living people)